Ruta and Daitya is a studio album recorded by Keith Jarrett and Jack DeJohnette in 1971 and released by ECM Records in 1973. Featuring seven duet pieces, it is one of Jarrett's rare performances on electric keyboards.

Production 
In his biography Keith Jarrett: The Man And His Music, Ian Carr states that "early in 1971, when the Miles Davis group was doing a few days at Shelly's Manne Hole in Los Angeles, a friend from the Sunset Studios there offered Jarrett and DeJohnette some free studio time to record as a duo. They took drums and percussion and the electric piano and organ from the club and made a tape (..)" and that after the Facing You recording session Jarrett gave Manfred Eicher the tapes of the duo recording to be mixed and produce the album.

Reception 
The Allmusic review by Richard S. Ginell awarded the album 3 stars, stating, "this is a valuable, underrated transition album that provides perhaps the last glimpse of the electric Keith Jarrett as he embarked on his notorious (and ultimately triumphant) anti-electric crusade".

Track listing 
All compositions by Keith Jarrett and Jack DeJohnette except as indicated
 "Overture/Communion" - 6:00
 "Ruta and Daitya" - 11:14
 "All We Got" - 2:00
 "Sounds of Peru/Submergence/Awakening" - 6:31
 "Algeria" - 5:47
 "You Know, You Know" (Jarrett) - 7:44
 "Pastel Morning" (Jarrett) - 2:04

Personnel 
 Keith Jarrett – piano, electric piano, organ, flute
 Jack DeJohnette - drums, percussion

Production
 Manfred Eicher  - producer
 Kurt Rapp  - engineer (mixing)
 Martin Wieland  - engineer (mixing)
 Barbara Wojirsch - cover design and layout

References 

Keith Jarrett albums
Jack DeJohnette albums
ECM Records albums
1971 albums
Albums produced by Manfred Eicher